John Joseph Block (born March 1, 1978) is a radio and TV play-by-play announcer who calls games for the Pittsburgh Pirates on AT&T SportsNet Pittsburgh and KDKA-FM, joining the team in 2016 after 4 years with the Milwaukee Brewers.

Broadcasting career
Block works with Pirates play-by-play announcer Greg Brown and color analysts Michael McKenry, Bob Walk and John Wehner to complete the Pirates five-person broadcast team. Block previously worked with veteran broadcaster and former Major League Baseball catcher Bob Uecker.

He called minor league games for the Great Falls White Sox, Jacksonville Suns, Billings Mustangs, and select games for the final two seasons of the Montreal Expos. Block served as a post-game host for the Los Angeles Dodgers on the radio. He was the radio studio host and backup announcer for the New Orleans Hornets and handled play-by-play for various regional networks for college football and basketball before the Brewers hired him.  On January 30, 2016 he was hired to serve as play-by-play announcer for the Pittsburgh Pirates replacing Tim Neverett who left to become the radio play-by-play voice for the Boston Red Sox. Neverett replaced Dave O'Brien who switched over to TV for the Red Sox after Don Orsillo left the team to join the San Diego Padres.

Personal life
Block grew up in Roseville, Michigan. He then went to Chippewa Valley High School in Clinton Twp, MI. He graduated from Michigan State University of 1999 and resided on the east side of Milwaukee with his wife, Bethany, when he was with the Brewers from 2012–2015. His wife is from the Pittsburgh area and they will reside in the Pittsburgh area for the upcoming season.

Also an avid Softball player Joe once played for the Ashers Market 1996 Championship team in nearby Mt Clemens, once lacing a game altering triple off of the defending champ Yankees team.

Possibly most known for High School classmate Zach Lange coming to one of Paul Opalewski's epic bashes and in hot pursuit shouting out the now infamous line "Which one's Joe"?

See also
 Pittsburgh Pirates broadcasters and media

References

External links
 https://web.archive.org/web/20131008055009/http://joeblock.com/bio.html
 http://www.linkedin.com/in/j0ebl0ck
 http://milwaukee.brewers.mlb.com/news/article.jsp?ymd=20111223&content_id=26230806&c_id=mil
 http://milwaukee.brewers.mlb.com/team/broadcasters.jsp?c_id=mil 
 http://m.pirates.mlb.com/news/article/163247532/pirates-hire-broadcaster-joe-block

1978 births
Living people
American radio sports announcers
College basketball announcers in the United States
College football announcers
Major League Baseball broadcasters
Michigan State University alumni
Milwaukee Brewers announcers
Minor League Baseball broadcasters
Montreal Expos announcers
National Basketball Association broadcasters
New Orleans Hornets announcers
People from Roseville, Michigan
Pittsburgh Pirates announcers